Grémillon is a French surname. Notable people with the surname include:

Hélène Grémillon (born 1977), French author
Jean Grémillon (1901–1959), French film director

See also
Gremillion

French-language surnames